Jô Bilac, (born 1985 as Giovanni Ramalho Bilac) is a Brazilian playwright, he debuted in 2006 as  a professional playwright.

Bilac has an Indian father and a Brazilian mother and spent most of his childhood in Madrid, Spain. When he returned to Brazil he lived with his family in the Rio de Janeiro area of Urca and got his first contact with the world of theater with plays staged at the Colégio Andrews. Later he started studying theater at FAETEC in Niterói and also Escola de Teatro Martins Pena. At the age of nineteen he wrote his first play, Sangue na caixa de areia. In 2006 he made his debut as a professional playwright at the culture center Sérgio Porto with the play Bruxarias urbanas.

In 2007, he wrote the comedy Desperadas, the same year he made 2 p/ viagem and Cachorro!; the last one was played at the Companhia Teatro Independente. In 2008 Limpe todo sangue antes que manche o carpete a new play of Bilac was made at Teatro Solar de Botafogo.

In 2010, Bilac won the "Prêmio Shell"-award for his play Savana Glacial.

Plays
2006 – Bruxarias urbanas 
2007 – Desesperadas
2007 – 2 p/ viagem
2007 – Cachorro!
2008 – Limpe todo o sangue antes que manche o carpete 
2009 – Rebú
2010 – Savana glacial* 
2010 – O matador de santas
2011 – Serpente verde sabor maçã  
2011 – Alguém acaba de morrer lá fora 
2011 – O gato branco
2011 – Popcorn – Qualquer semelhança não é mera coincidência
2012 – Os mamutes 
2012 – Cucaracha 
2013 – Caixa de areia* 
2013 – Petit monstre
2013 – Conselho de classe

References

Living people
1984 births
21st-century Brazilian dramatists and playwrights
21st-century Brazilian male writers
Brazilian male dramatists and playwrights